Sárbogárd is a district in southern part of Fejér County. Sárbogárd is also the name of the town where the district seat is found. The district is located in the Central Transdanubia Statistical Region.

Geography 
Sárbogárd District borders with Székesfehérvár District to the north, Dunaújváros District to the east, Paks District and Tamási District (Tolna County) to the south, Enying District to the west. The number of the inhabited places in Sárbogárd District is 12.

Municipalities 
The district has 1 town, 1 large village and 10 villages.
(ordered by population, as of 1 January 2012)

The bolded municipality is city, italics municipality is large village.

See also
List of cities and towns in Hungary

References

External links
 Postal codes of the Sárbogárd District

Districts in Fejér County